The Santa Ana Winds Youth Band was a community youth marching band in Orange County, California. The band's name was derived from the Santa Ana winds weather pattern, and is a reference to the fact that the many performers use wind instruments.

Band history 
The band was started in 1971 by Robert Ward (d. May 31, 2008) and quickly grew to become a staple group in parades across Southern California.

On October 20, 1971, the Board of Managers of the Santa Ana/Tustin Y.M.C.A. approved the band as an affiliate club. The Winds were appointed as the "Official Ambassadors of Music for Orange County" by the Board of Supervisors of Orange County, and still hold that distinguished title.

The 2007-2008 season was the 37th season of The Santa Ana Winds Youth Band, and was under the direction of Greg Rochford. The 2010-2011 season was under the direction of Anna Sintora and Abel Acosta as Co-Band Directors.

Performances 

The Santa Ana Winds have performed in hundreds of events over their 35 years serving the community. They have performed in parades, field shows, and concerts throughout the United States, Canada, and Europe.

The band has marched in the Hollywood Christmas Parade for over thirty-two years. They have appeared in such films as Coneheads, First Daughter, a Sprung Monkey video, S.F.W., Witch Hunt (1994 film), and an episode of Boston Public, among other events.

The group was a two-time national field show champion. They recorded a record in London during one of their European tours.

Membership
No audition was required, and membership was open to any youth ages 14–21. The band accepted all wind instruments, percussion, flag spinners, baton twirlers, drum majors, and banner carriers. Members come from Orange County, Los Angeles County, Riverside County, San Bernardino County, and some from Imperial County, San Diego County and Ventura County.

External links

References

Musical groups from Orange County, California
American marching bands
Musical groups established in 1971